Zante is an unincorporated community in the San Joaquin Valley, within Tulare County, central California.

History
The town is named for the Zante currant, a type of small raisin and a crop grown in the area.

References

Unincorporated communities in Tulare County, California
Unincorporated communities in California